Gordon Atkinson may refer to:

 Gordon Atkinson (Australian politician) (1941–1984), state politician in Western Australia
 Gordon Atkinson (Canadian politician) (1922–2006), provincial politician in Quebec